Interpol Against X (French: Interpol contre X) is a 1960 French crime film directed by Maurice Boutel and starring Howard Vernon, Maria Vincent and Andrex. It is also known by the alternative title of Dossier AST-555.

Cast
 Howard Vernon as L'inspecteur Jackson  
 Maria Vincent as Madeleine 
 Andrex as Mathias  
 Junie Astor as Magda  
 Marcel Pérès as Victor Belloy  
 Joëlle Bernard as Lucy  
 Pauline Carton as Louise Belloy  
 Frédéric O'Brady as Mike  
 Robert Dalban as Commissaire Meunier  
 Roland Bailly as Chando  
 Georges Bever as Le gardien de la morgue  
 Fernand Rauzéna as Commissaire Masson  
 Jacques Bourgeois 
 Ronald Bell 
 Edgar Duvivier
 Paul Grandjean 
 Robert Lassus 
 Pierre Moncorbier 
 Habib Mustapha as Le contact à Istanbul 
 Marcel Duhamel
 Michel Garland 
 Fernand Kindt

References

Bibliography 
 Philippe Rège. Encyclopedia of French Film Directors, Volume 1. Scarecrow Press, 2009.

External links 
 

1960 films
1960 crime films
French crime films
1960s French-language films
Films directed by Maurice Boutel
1960s French films